The Sacramento River is a short river in Mexico, the main tributary of the Chuvíscar River, which in turn is a tributary of the Rio Conchos which runs entirely through the state of Chihuahua to the Río Bravo.

History
On February 28, 1847, a Mexican army in a defensive position was engaged by an advancing U.S. Army and was defeated along the river during the Mexican–American War. The engagement, fought about fifteen miles north of Chihuahua, is known as the Battle of the Sacramento.  The American victory permitted their army to occupy Chihuahua unopposed on March 2.

See also
List of rivers of Mexico
Battle of the Sacramento

References

The Prentice Hall American World Atlas, 1984.
Rand McNally, The New International Atlas, 1993.

Rivers of Chihuahua (state)
Rio Conchos